The  Cubatão River is a river of Santa Catarina state in southeastern Brazil.

The sources of the river are in the  Serra do Tabuleiro State Park, a mountainous region to the south west of Florianópolis covered in lush rain forest.
The river supplies water to the greater Florianópolis region.
It enters the Atlantic to the south of the suburb of Palhoça.

See also
List of rivers of Santa Catarina

References

 Map from Ministry of Transport

Rivers of Santa Catarina (state)